The 2022 XPEL 375 was the second round of the 2022 IndyCar season. The race was held on March 20, 2022, in Fort Worth, Texas at the Texas Motor Speedway, consisting of 248 laps.

Entry list

Practice

Practice 1

Final Practice

Qualifying

Qualifying classification

Race 
The race was started at 12:30 PM ET on March 20, 2022.

Race classification

Championship standings after the race 

Drivers' Championship standings

Engine manufacturer standings

 Note: Only the top five positions are included.

Footnotes

References

External links 

XPEL 375
XPEL 375
21st century in Fort Worth, Texas
XPEL 375